Helen Walden  is an English structural biologist who received the Colworth medal from the Biochemical Society in 2015. She was awarded European Molecular Biology Organization (EMBO) membership in 2022. She is a Professor of Structural Biology at the University of Glasgow and has made significant contributions to the Ubiquitination field.

Education and academic career 
Helen Walden studied for a BSc in Biochemistry at the University of Bath. She moved to the University of St Andrews and was awarded a PhD for investigating the structural basis of protein hyperthermostability. After a postdoctoral fellowship at St Jude's Children's Research Hospital, Walden moved to London to set up a lab at the Cancer Research UK London Research Institute (and now part of the Francis Crick Institute). After tenure, Walden moved to the MRC-Phosphorylation and Ubiquitylation Unit at the University of Dundee where in 2016 she was promoted to professor. In 2017, Walden relocated her lab to the University of Glasgow as Professor of Structural Biology.

Research interests 
At St Jude's Children's Research Hospital,  Helen Walden developed her interest in the mechanisms of ubiquitination, solving the structure of the E1 for Nedd8. In London, Walden studied the specificity and regulation of E3 ubiquitin ligases.  In recent years Walden has studied the mechanism and disease association of E2-conjugating enzymes.  Walden has investigated the role of Parkin in Parkinson's disease. Her study of the  Fanconi Anemia pathway has allowed Walden to begin developing small molecules to target the pathway.

Professional associations and awards 

 In 2011, Walden joined the European Molecular Biology Organisation (EMBO) Young Investigator Program.
 In 2015, Walden was awarded the Colworth medal from the Biochemical Society. 
 In 2016, Walden  was awarded an ERC grant of €2 million to investigate DNA damage and repair.
 In 2022, Walden was named as a Fellow of the Royal Society of Edinburgh.
 In 2022, Walden was awarded EMBO membership.

References 

Year of birth missing (living people)
Living people
Alumni of the University of St Andrews
Alumni of the University of Bath
English women biologists
21st-century British biologists
Academics of the University of Glasgow
Academics of the University of Dundee
Francis Crick Institute alumni
21st-century English women
21st-century English people
Fellows of the Royal Society of Edinburgh
Members of the European Molecular Biology Organization